Massaranduba is a municipality in the state of Santa Catarina in the South region of Brazil. As of 2020, the municipality has a population of 17,125.

See also
List of municipalities in Santa Catarina

Twin towns — sister cities
  Canale d'Agordo in Italy (since 2011)
  Vallada Agordina in Italy (since 2011)
  San Tomaso Agordino in Italy (since 2011)
  Cencenighe Agordino in Italy (since 2011)
  Falcade in Italy (since 2011)

References

Municipalities in Santa Catarina (state)